The Concord Fund (formally known as the Judicial Crisis Network and, before that, as the Judicial Confirmation Network) is an American conservative advocacy organization. Its president is Carrie Severino, a former law clerk for Supreme Court justice Clarence Thomas. In 2020, OpenSecrets described the organization as having "unmatched influence in recent years in shaping the federal judiciary." It is among a network of organizations associated with Leonard Leo, a longtime executive in the Federalist Society, that are funded mostly by anonymous donors and distributed by Concord and a related group, The 85 Fund.

Background
The organization was founded in 2005 to promote the judicial appointees of then president George W. Bush. Fundraiser and lawyer Ann Corkery, along with California real estate magnate Robin Arkley II, were key to the beginning of the organization.

The current leader is Carrie Severino. She was previously a law clerk to United States Supreme Court Justice Clarence Thomas and to Judge David B. Sentelle of the United States Court of Appeals for the District of Columbia Circuit. She is a contributor to National Review. She is married to Roger Severino.

Severino received her J.D. degree from Harvard Law School, where she was a student while Elena Kagan was dean. Severino has been involved with constitutional challenges to the Affordable Care Act.

Funding
The leading funder of Concord is the Wellspring Committee, which is directed by Ann Corkery. Wellspring was part of the Koch political financing network leading up to the 2008 elections, then was later used by Leonard Leo's associates to direct money to Concord's predecessor organizations. Wellspring, which does not disclose who funds it, gave close to $7 million to Concord in 2014; between 2012 and 2015, it reported giving Concord more than $15 million. Concord's tax return for the period July 2015 to June 2016 shows that one $17.9 million donation, whose source was not reported, accounted for 96.6 percent of the organization's revenue.

Advocacy activities
In 2013, Concord ran ads in Alaska that were critical of U.S. senator Mark Begich's votes to approve all of president Barack Obama's federal judicial nominees. The group also ran advertisements that were critical of Mary Landrieu and Mark Pryor's votes for president Obama's court picks. In 2014, the group ran digital advertisements critical of Chris Christie's judicial appointments. Concord has been active in Michigan and North Carolina supreme court elections.

In 2015, the Judicial Crisis Network donated $600,000 to Nebraskans for the Death Penalty, a group promoting reinstatement of capital punishment in Nebraska.

In 2016, Concord ran a negative advertisement about Jane L. Kelly, a federal appeals judge from Iowa who was on a White House list of possible nominees to the U.S. Supreme Court.

Also in 2016, Concord bought advertisements across the country to oppose president Obama's supreme court nominee, chief judge of the United States Court of Appeals for the District of Columbia Circuit Merrick Garland. In November 2016, after Donald Trump was elected president of the United States, Concord ran television advertisements praising senate judiciary chairman Chuck Grassley for holding the line against Garland. The group also spent over $500,000 on advertisements thanking Trump for his campaign promises regarding the types of justices he would select for the nation's high court. Concord's advertisements asked viewers to thank Trump for pledging to nominate conservative jurists in the mold of Antonin Scalia to the Supreme Court.

On January 31, 2017, the Judicial Crisis Network committed to spending $10 million on advocacy ads in favor of president Donald Trump's first Supreme Court of the United States nominee, Neil Gorsuch.

The Judicial Crisis Network spent $4.5 million in ad buys supportive of the confirmation of Brett Kavanaugh to the U.S. Supreme Court. In 2019, the watchdog group Campaign for Accountability accused Concord of sending illegal robotexts to Indiana residents about the Supreme Court nomination of Kavanaugh.

In September 2020, after the death of Supreme Court Justice Ruth Bader Ginsburg, Concord launched a $2.2 million campaign to support President Trump's right to appoint a judge prior to the November 2020 presidential election.

The 85 Fund, formerly known as the Judicial Education Project, is closely aligned with the Concord.

References

External links 
 

Legal organizations based in the United States
Legal education in the United States
Organizations established in 2005
2005 establishments in the United States